USS Halcyon II (SP-582) was a yacht acquired by the U.S. Navy during World War I. She was outfitted as an armed patrol craft and stationed in Boston harbor in Massachusetts. She spent much of the war patrolling the Massachusetts waterways for German submarines and, in 1919, was decommissioned after being damaged in a collision.

Commissioned at Boston 

Halcyon II, a 161-ton steam yacht, was built by Charles Seabury Gas Engine & Power Co. of Morris Heights, Bronx, New York in 1907, and was purchased by the Navy in August 1917 from her owner, D. W. Flint of Providence, Rhode Island. She commissioned 15 December 1917 at Boston Navy Yard.

World War I service 
 
After fitting out, Halcyon II was employed as a section and harbor patrol boat in Boston Harbor through the rest of World War I and into the first year of peace. She performed this service until 4 June 1919 when she was rammed and seriously damaged by the steamer Bayou Teohe.

Decommissioning and disposal 

Determined by the Navy to be unserviceable, she was struck from the Navy List 31 July 1919 and sold her back to her former owner on 4 December 1919.

References 
 
 USS Halcyon II (SP-582), 1917-1919 Originally named Halcyon; later renamed SP-582
 NavSource Online: SP-582 - ex-Halcyon II (SP-582)

 

World War I auxiliary ships of the United States
Patrol vessels of the United States Navy
Steam yachts
Ships built in Morris Heights, Bronx
1907 ships
Maritime incidents in 1919